Anchal may refer to:
 Anchal (name), which may be either a surname or a given name
Anchal, town in India

See also
Aanchal (disambiguation)